USS Mariano G. Vallejo (SSBN-658), was a  fleet ballistic missile submarine, was named for Mariano Guadalupe Vallejo (1807–1890), a key proponent of California statehood. The boat's service extended from 1966 until 1995.

Construction and commissioning
The contract to build Mariano G. Vallejo was awarded to Mare Island Naval Shipyard at Vallejo, California, on 8 August 1963 and her keel was laid down there on 7 July 1964.  She was launched on 23 October 1965, sponsored by Miss Patricia Oliver Vallejo McGettigan, great-great- granddaughter of Mariano Vallejo, and commissioned on 16 December 1966, with Commander Douglas B. Guthe commanding the Blue Crew and Commander John K. Nunneley commanding the Gold Crew.

Service history
Mariano G. Vallejo conducted shakedown and training exercises along the United States West Coast, in the Caribbean Sea, and off the coast of Florida. Transiting the Panama Canal for the second time on 21 March 1967, she headed for her assigned home port, Pearl Harbor, Hawaii. Arriving there on 10 April 1967, she continued training exercises and sound trials, then returned briefly to Mare Island Naval Shipyard. From there she sailed back to Pearl Harbor, becoming, as of 1 August 1967, a fully operational unit of Submarine Squadron 15, ready to conduct strategic deterrent patrols.

Mariano G. Vallejo was the last to patrol, last to off-load her missiles and the last to arrive in Washington making her the last of the "Forty-one for Freedom." On 2 August 1994, the submarine left Charleston for the last time. She arrived at the Panama Canal on 10 August and during the voyage to San Diego transited  from the epicenter of a 7.2 earthquake. In port at the Mare Island shipyard the crew hosted over three thousand tours of the boat in eleven days.

Decommissioning and disposal
Mariano G. Vallejo was both decommissioned and stricken from the Naval Vessel Register on 9 March 1995. Her scrapping via the U.S. Navys Nuclear-Powered Ship and Submarine Recycling Program at Bremerton, Washington, began on 1 October 1994 and was completed on 22 December 1995.

Commemoration
Mariano G. Vallejos sail was preserved, and has been on the waterfront at Mare Island since 1995. Much of this time, the sail sat at the docks, exposed to the elements and mostly neglected. As of 2019, it was moved to a permanent memorial located within the Mare Island Museum as part of the Save-Our-Sail Project.  In addition to the preservation of the sail, the control room of Mariano G. Vallejo was reconstructed including a fully operational periscope from Mariano G. Vallejo.

A Google Street View of the boat's sail prior to its installation at the museum is located here.

References 

 
 
  – Navsource

External links
 
 
 

Benjamin Franklin-class submarines
Cold War submarines of the United States
Nuclear submarines of the United States Navy
Ships built in Vallejo, California
1965 ships